Hassan Mohamed may refer to:
 Hassan Mohamed (basketball), Qatari basketball player
 Hassan Mohamed (football), Emirati association football player

See also
 Abdiaziz Hassan Mohamed, Somali politician; see List of Members of the Federal Parliament of Somalia
 Abdullahi Haji Hassan Mohamed Nuur (active from 2011), Somali politician
 Hassan Mohamed Hussein (born 1972), Somali politician
 Hassan Sheikh Mohamud (born 1955), Somali politician
 Mohamed Hassan Mohamed (born 1993), Somali middle-distance runner